Isac Lundeström (born 6 November 1999) is a Swedish professional ice hockey forward for the Anaheim Ducks of the National Hockey League (NHL). Lundeström was selected by the Ducks in the first round, 23rd overall, of the 2018 NHL Entry Draft.

Playing career
On 7 August 2018, Lundeström signed a three-year, entry-level contract with the Ducks.

With the 2020–21 North American season delayed due to the COVID-19 pandemic, Lundeström in order to recommence playing signed on loan with Allsvenskan club, Timrå IK, on 5 October 2020. He made 12 appearances with Timrå IK, recording 5 goals and 11 points before he was recalled from his loan spell by the Ducks on 16 November 2020. On 1 March 2021, Lundeström recorded his first NHL hat-trick with three goals in the Ducks' 5–4 loss against the St. Louis Blues.

Career statistics

Regular season and playoffs

International

References

External links
 

1999 births
Living people
Anaheim Ducks draft picks
Anaheim Ducks players
Luleå HF players
National Hockey League first-round draft picks
People from Gällivare Municipality
San Diego Gulls (AHL) players
Swedish ice hockey forwards
Timrå IK players
Sportspeople from Norrbotten County